Jagan's Degree College is a commerce, arts, and natural sciences College in Ramalingapuram, Nellore District of Andhra Pradesh, India. It was established in 2000 and is affiliated to Vikrama Simhapuri University. The college offers Bachelor of Science and Master of Science courses in subjects including mathematics, physics, electronics and business management.

References 

Colleges in Andhra Pradesh
Universities and colleges in Nellore district
Educational institutions established in 2000
2000 establishments in Andhra Pradesh